The 2005 Sun Belt Conference men's basketball tournament was held March 4–8 at UNT Coliseum in Denton, TX.

Second-seed from the West division  defeated #1 seed from the West division  in the championship game, 88–69, to win their fifth Sun Belt men's basketball tournament.

The Ragin' Cajuns received an automatic bid to the 2004 NCAA tournament as the #13 seed in the Albuquerque region. No other Sun Belt members earned bids to the tournament.

Format
All eleven participating Sun Belt members were seeded based on regular season conference records.

Bracket

See also
Sun Belt Conference men's basketball tournament

References

Sun Belt Conference men's basketball tournament
Tournament
Sun Belt Conference men's basketball tournament
Sun Belt Conference men's basketball tournament